Peksimet, an inland village in Turkey, located on the Bodrum Peninsula. It is part of the Turgutreis municipality and is 7 km from central Turgutreis.

It is easy to drive through Peksimet without realizing it, but every driver can recognize the location of this village, thanks to a group of windmills on the hill.

History 

Peksimet is also the Turkish word for twice-baked bread (similar to a hard rusk), and Peksimet got its name because the villagers supplied this bread to Turkish soldiers during the Turkish War of Independence (1919–1923), and the locals became known for its baking.

References

Fishing communities
Bodrum District
Villages in Muğla Province